Nyrölä Observatory is an amateur astronomical observatory in Finland. It is owned and operated by the astronomical association Jyväskylän Sirius ry, and located in the countryside village of Nyrölä near Jyväskylä.

Discoveries: asteroid 22978 Nyrola that was the first asteroid discovered by Finnish amateur astronomers, Harri Hyvönen, Marko Moilanen and Arto Oksanen. The Minor Planet Center currently credits this discovery to the observatory.

See also 
 List of astronomical observatories
 Hankasalmi Observatory

References

External links 
 Nyrölä Observatory

Nyrola Observatory
Astronomical observatories in Finland